Minuscule 226 (in the Gregory-Aland numbering), ε 118 (Soden), is a Greek minuscule manuscript of the New Testament, on a parchment. Paleographically it has been assigned to the 12th century. It has marginalia.

Description 

The codex contains entire of New Testament (except Book of Revelation), on 377 parchment leaves (size ). Catholic epistles placed before Pauline epistles.
The leaves are arranged in octavo (eight leaves in quire). The text is written in one column per page, 26 lines per page, in neat minuscule letters. According to Emmanuel Miller it is very elegantly written.

The text of the Gospels is also divided according to the smaller Ammonian Sections, with references to the Eusebian Canons (written below Ammonian Section numbers).

Many corrections were made by a later hand, but original text is valuable, with some unique readings.

Text 

The Greek text of the codex is a representative of the Byzantine text-type. Hermann von Soden placed it in textual family Kx. Kurt Aland placed it in Category V.
According to the Claremont Profile Method it represents Kx in Luke 1, Luke 10, and Luke 20.

History 

The manuscript is dated by the INTF to the 12th century.

The manuscript was collated together with codices 227-233 by Moldenhawer, who made it about 1783 for Birch (Esc. 2). It was briefly described by Emmanuel Miller.

It is currently housed at the Library of the Monastery of El Escorial (Cod. Escurialensis, X. IV. 17).

See also 
 List of New Testament minuscules
 Biblical manuscript
 Textual criticism
 Minuscule 818

References

Further reading 

 Emmanuel Miller, Catalogue des manuscrits grecs de la bibliothèque de l'Escurial (Paris 1848), p. 406
 

Greek New Testament minuscules
12th-century biblical manuscripts